Jochem "Joki" Schindler (8 November 1944 in Amstetten, Lower Austria – 24 December 1994 in Prague) was an Austrian Indo-Europeanist. In spite of his comparatively thin bibliography, he made important contributions, in particular to the theory of Proto-Indo-European nominal inflection and ablaut. Taught at University of Vienna from 1972 - 1978, as a professor at Harvard University from 1978 - 1987, then at Vienna. A meticulous scholar, he also recognized that mistakes were inevitable, and his phrase "Mut zum Irrtum" ("courage to err") became popular with his colleagues, including Calvert Watkins. With Watkins and others, he was a founding member of the  “East Coast Indo-European Conference” in 1982.

Partial Bibliography

1966. ‘Bemerkungen zum idg. Wort für “Schlaf”’, Die Sprache 12, 67–76.

1970. Review of Anttila 1969, Kratylos 15, 146–52.

1972 'L'apophonie des noms racines indo-européens' Bulletin de la Société Linguistique de Paris 67, 31–8. 

1975a. 'L'apophonie des thèmes indo-européens en -r/n ' Bulletin de la Société Linguistique de Paris 70, 1–10.

1975b. ‘Zum Ablaut der neutralen s-Stämme des Indogermanischen’, in Helmut Rix (ed.), Flexion und Wortbildung, 259–67, Wiesbaden: Reichert.

1977a. ‘A thorny problem’, Die Sprache 23, 25–35.

1977b. ‘Notizen zum Sieversschen Gesetz’, Die Sprache 23, 56–65.

1994. ‘Alte und neue Fragen zum indogermanischen Nomen’, in Jens E. Rasmussen (ed.), In Honorem Holger Pederson, 397–400, Wiesbaden: Reichert.

References

Eichner (ed.) Compositiones Indogermanicae in memoriam Jochem Schindler, Praha (1999).
Wolfgang U. Dressler "Jochem Schindler (1944-1994)" in Die Sprache 37/1 (1995), 1–4.
Rüdiger Schmitt, "Jochem Schindler. Ein Nachruf" in Almanach der Österreichischen Akademie der Wissenschaften 145 (1995), 581–594.

External links
 Thesaurus Indogermanischer Text- und Sprachmaterialien

1944 births
1994 deaths
Linguists from Austria
Linguists of Indo-European languages
Paleolinguists
20th-century linguists